Qian Ping (born 1964) is a former world level badminton player from China.

Career
Qian was among the youngest of an impressive cadre of Chinese players who largely dominated women's international badminton after China joined the International Badminton Federation (now Badminton World Federation) in 1981. She was a member of China's world champion Uber Cup (women's international) teams of 1984 and 1986. Qian won singles at the Denmark (1982 autumn), and German (1985, 1987) Opens, and was a runner-up in several other top tier tournaments on the world circuit, including the All-England Championships in both 1986 and 1987. In the second of these All-England finals, playing Denmark's Kirsten Larsen, she was forced to default after injuring her knee, an event that apparently ended her serious playing career.

Achievements

World Cup

Asian Games

Asian Championships

IBF World Grand Prix 
The World Badminton Grand Prix sanctioned by International Badminton Federation (IBF) from 1983 to 2006.

International tournaments

References

Chinese female badminton players
1964 births
Living people
Asian Games medalists in badminton
Badminton players at the 1986 Asian Games
Badminton players from Jiangxi
Asian Games gold medalists for China
Medalists at the 1986 Asian Games
Asian Games bronze medalists for China